Péter Kollár (Slovene Peter Kolar, 18 June 1855 – 31 December 1908) was a Hungarian Slovenian Roman Catholic priest and writer.

Born in Ratkovci, Prekmurje, his parents were Péter Kollár and Judit Zselezen. He was ordained on 13 July 1882. He was a chaplain in Črenšovci until 1885 and later a parish clerk in Bogojina. From 1885 to 1887, he was a chaplain in Murska Sobota, after which he spent one year each in Beltinci and Turnišče. By 1900, he had become a priest in Beltinci.

In 1897, Kollár wrote a biblical textbook in Slovenian.

Works
 Mála biblia z-kejpami ali zgodba zvelicsanya za málo decsiczo : za I-II razréd normálszke sôle piszana po Gerely Józsefi ; z-27 z-leszá pritisznyenimi kejpmi od G. Morelli. – Budapest, Szent István Társulat, 1897.
 Mála biblia z-kejpami ali zgodba zvelicsanya za málo decsiczo : za I-II razréd normálszke sôle piszana po Gerely Józsefi ; z-27 z-leszá pritisznyenimi kejpmi od G. Morelli. - 2. natiszk. Budapest, Szent István Társulat, 1898.
 Návuk odpotrdjenyá ali férme. Z-vogrszkoga velikoga katekizmusa na sztári szlovenszki jezik obernyeni po Kollár Petri beltinszkom plebánusi 1902.

See also
 List of Slovene writers and poets in Hungary

External links
 Hungarian books in local Slovenian dialect 1715-1919
 Digital library of the Vas County - Episcopal district

Slovenian writers and poets in Hungary
19th-century Slovenian Roman Catholic priests
1855 births
1908 deaths
20th-century Slovenian Roman Catholic priests